Apparent leukonychia is a cutaneous condition characterized by white discoloration of the nail that fades with pressure.

See also 
 Nail anatomy
 List of cutaneous conditions

References 

Conditions of the skin appendages